The Pakistan women's national cricket team toured Bangladesh in March 2014. They played Bangladesh in two One Day Internationals and two Twenty20 Internationals, with Bangladesh winning the ODI series 2–0 and Pakistan winning the T20I series 2–0. The tour preceded both sides' participation in the 2014 ICC Women's World Twenty20, which also took place in Bangladesh.

Squads

WODI Series

1st ODI

2nd ODI

WT20I Series

1st T20I

2nd T20I

See also
 2014 ICC Women's World Twenty20

References

External links
Pakistan Women tour of Bangladesh 2013/14 from Cricinfo

International cricket competitions in 2014
2014 in women's cricket
Women's international cricket tours of Bangladesh
Pakistan women's national cricket team tours
2014 in Bangladeshi cricket
2014 in Bangladeshi women's sport